Knefastia is a genus of sea snails, marine gastropod mollusks in the family Pseudomelatomidae.

Taxonomy
This genus was previously included in the subfamily Cochlespirinae of the family Turridae.

Species
Species within the genus Knefastia include:
 † Knefastia aenigmatica Landau, Da Silva & Heitz, 2016 
 Knefastia altenai Macsotay & Campos Villarroel, 2001
 † Knefastia chira Olsson, 1931
 †Knefastia coislinensis (Cossman, 1898)
 † Knefastia crassinoda (Des Moulins, 1842)
 † Knefastia cubaguaensis Landau, Da Silva & Heitz, 2016
 Knefastia dalli Bartsch, 1944
 † Knefastia decipiens (Deshayes, 1865) 
 † Knefastia etteri Landau, Da Silva & Heitz, 2016
 Knefastia funiculata (Kiener, 1840)
 † Knefastia glypta Gardner, 1937
 Knefastia hilli Petuch, 1990
 Knefastia howelli (Hertlein & Strong, 1951)
 † Knefastia kugleri Jung, 1965
 † Knefastia limonensis Olsson, 1922
 † Knefastia lindae Petuch, 1994
 Knefastia olivacea (Sowerby I, 1834)
 † Knefastia polygona (Deshayes, 1834) 
 Knefastia princeps Berry, 1953
 † Knefastia rouaulti (Cossmann, 1923)
 † Knefastia sainti (de Boury, 1899) 
 Knefastia tuberculifera (Broderip & Sowerby I, 1829)
 Knefastia walkeri Berry, 1958
 † Knefastia waltonia Gardner, 1937
Species brought into synonymy
 Knefastia horrenda (Watson, 1886): synonym of Stenodrillia horrenda (R. B. Watson, 1886)
 † Knefastia lavinoides Olsson, 1922: synonym of † Knefastia limonensis Olsson, 1922
 Knefastia nigricans (Dall, 1919): synonym of Crassispira maura (Sowerby I, 1834)

References

External links
 
 Bouchet, P.; Kantor, Y. I.; Sysoev, A.; Puillandre, N. (2011). A new operational classification of the Conoidea (Gastropoda). Journal of Molluscan Studies. 77(3): 273-308
 Worldwide Mollusc Species Data Base: Pseudomelatomidae
 Fossilworks: Knefastia
 MNHN, Paris : Knefastia

 
Pseudomelatomidae
Gastropod genera